There are seven medical schools in Ireland from which students can obtain a medical degree, including six schools in the Republic of Ireland and one school in Northern Ireland. Medical schools in the Republic of Ireland are accredited by the Medical Council of Ireland, while Northern Ireland is regulated by the General Medical Council. All schools except University of Limerick Medical School offer undergraduate courses in medicine.

Republic of Ireland

Northern Ireland

See also
 List of medical schools in the United Kingdom

References 

Ireland